Percy Edward Mann (12 May 1888 – 23 September 1974) was a British track and field athlete who competed in the 1912 Summer Olympics. He was born in Eltham and died in Warrington. In 1912 he was eliminated in the semi-finals of the 800 metres competition.

References

External links
 sports-reference.com

1888 births
1974 deaths
People from Eltham
British male middle-distance runners
English male middle-distance runners
Olympic athletes of Great Britain
Athletes (track and field) at the 1912 Summer Olympics